The Pakiputan Wharf Road is a , two-lane road that connects the Pan-Philippine Highway to the Port of Davao. It serves as Davao's main road for port access.

The highway forms part of National Route 914 (N914) of the Philippine highway network

References 

Roads in Davao del Sur
Davao City